Duchess Sophie in Bavaria (22 February 1875 in Possenhofen, Bavaria – 4 September 1957 in Kreuth, Germany).

Biography

Family 

Her parents were Karl Theodor, Duke in Bavaria, head of a cadet branch of the Bavarian royal family, and an ophthalmologist of recognized reputation, and his second wife, the Infanta Maria José of Braganza, third daughter of King Miguel I, exiled monarch of Portugal. Her paternal aunt was Empress Elisabeth of Austria (Sissi).  She was also the sister of Queen Elisabeth of the Belgians, consort of Albert I and of Marie Gabrielle, wife of the last crown prince of Bavaria, Rupprecht, later the head of the House of Wittelsbach. She was named after her father's first wife, Princess Sophie of Saxony, the mother of her half-sister Amalie.

Marriage and issue
On 26 July 1898 in Bavaria's capital, Munich, Sophie Adelheid married Count Hans Veit of Toerring-Jettenbach (Augsburg, 7 April 1862 – Munich, 29 October 1929), son of Count Clemens Maria Anton zu Toerring-Jettenbach (1826-1891) and his wife, Countess Franziska von Paumgarten (1834-1894). He was head of the mediatized House of Toerring-Jettenbach.  They had three children, nine grandchildren, thirteen great-grandchildren and eighteen great-great-grandchildren:

Count Carl Theodor of Toerring-Jettenbach (22 September 1900 – 14 May 1967) he married Princess Elizabeth of Greece and Denmark on 10 January 1934. They have two children, six grandchildren and sixteen great-grandchildren.

Ancestry

References

1875 births
1957 deaths
House of Wittelsbach
Bavarian princesses
Duchesses in Bavaria